The knockout stage of the 1990 FIFA World Cup was the second and final stage of the final tournament, following the group stage. It began on 23 June with the round of 16 matches, and ended on 8 July with the final held at the Stadio Olimpico in Rome, in which West Germany beat the defending champions Argentina 1–0 to claim their third World Cup.

Sixteen teams advanced to the knockout stage to compete in a single-elimination style tournament: The top two teams from each of the six groups, as well as the best four third-placed teams. In the round of 16, the four third-placed teams played against four of the group winners from group A-D, with the remaining two group winners from group E and F taking on two of the group runners-up; the remaining four runners-up were paired off against each other. The winners of the eight round of 16 matches were then paired together in the quarter-finals, the winners of which played against each other in the semi-finals.

The ties in each round were played over a single match; in the event that scores were level after 90 minutes, the teams would play an additional 30 minutes of extra time, divided into two 15-minute halves, to determine the winner. If the scores remained level after extra time, the teams would contest a penalty shootout.

A third place match was also held on the day before the final, between the two losing teams of the semi-finals.

Qualified teams
The top two placed teams from each of the six groups, plus the four best-placed third teams, qualified for the knockout stage.

Based on group results, the matches would be the following in Round of 16:

The pairings for matches 1, 4, 6 and 7 depend on who the best third places are that qualify for the round of 16. The following table published in Section 28 of the tournament regulations, shows the different options to define the opponents for the winners of groups A, B, C and D.

</onlyinclude>

Bracket

Round of 16
All times listed are local (UTC+1)

Cameroon vs Colombia

Czechoslovakia vs Costa Rica

Brazil vs Argentina

Brazil dominated for most of the match, but Diego Maradona went on a trademark run from the halfway line to the edge of the penalty area late in the match, and found Claudio Caniggia, who rounded the onrushing Cláudio Taffarel to give Argentina a lead that they would not relinquish.

West Germany vs Netherlands

Republic of Ireland vs Romania

Italy vs Uruguay

Spain vs Yugoslavia

England vs Belgium

Quarter-finals

Argentina vs Yugoslavia

Republic of Ireland vs Italy

Czechoslovakia vs West Germany

Cameroon vs England
Apart from anything else, it was the only quarter-final to produce more than one goal. Despite Cameroon's heroics earlier in the tournament, David Platt put England ahead in the 25th minute. At half-time, Cameroon brought Milla on, and the game was turned on its head in five second-half minutes. First Cameroon were awarded a penalty, from which Emmanuel Kunde scored the equaliser. Then, in the 65th minute, Eugene Ekeke put Cameroon ahead. The African team came within eight minutes of reaching the semi-finals, but then they conceded a penalty, which Gary Lineker gratefully converted. Midway through extra time, England were awarded another penalty, which Lineker again scored from the spot. England were through to the semi-finals for the first time in 24 years.

Yet England had grossly underestimated Cameroon's threat, despite the Indomitable Lions defeating then World Champions Argentina in the tournament's opening game and easily seeing off a highly-fancied Colombia in the Round of 16. Howard Wilkinson was observing Cameroon's progress for England and informed the players that this quarter-final match represented "A practical bye to the semi-finals". Chris Waddle, emerging afterwards, was reported to have told Wilkinson: "Some fucking bye that". England would not face African opposition in the knockout stage of a World Cup again until 2022's Round of 16 encounter with Senegal.

Semi-finals

Argentina vs Italy

West Germany vs England

Third place play-off

Final

References

External links
1990 FIFA World Cup at FIFA.com

Knockout Stage
1990
1990
Knockout stage
Knockout stage
Knockout stage
Knockout stage
Knockout stage
Knockout stage
Knockout stage
Knockout stage
Knockout stage
Knockout stage
Knockout stage
Knockout stage
Knockout stage
Knockout stage
Knockout stage
Knockout stage